The First Lady of the Dominican Republic the title referring to the wife, or designee, of the president of the Dominican Republic. The official government Office of the First Lady was created by Decree 741-00 on September 10, 2000.

The position of first lady is not a politically-mandated office, and as such, the first lady of the Dominican Republic plays no official role in the decision making aspect of the government of the Dominican Republic. However, similar to many other spouses of heads of state and heads of government, the first lady of the Dominican Republic is a public figure who often contributes to philanthropic causes and acts as an unofficial representative for the head of state. There is a government-funded Office of the First Lady, with a staff.

The current first lady of the Dominican Republic is Raquel Arbaje, the wife of President Luis Abinader, who has held the position since 2020.

References 

Dominican Republic